Liu Yan (born 8 November 1980), also known as Ada Liu, is a Chinese actress, hostess and singer. She won the "Best New Artist" at the 2nd Top Chinese Music Awards and the "Best Promising Host" at the 3rd Zongyi Award, in 2010 the Most Influencing Host of China named she on their list of the 10 Greatest hosts in Television.

Liu is noted for her roles as Dai Yiyi and Jiajia in Badges of Fury (2013) and The Incredible Truth (2013) respectively.

Life

Early life
Liu was born in Hengyang, Hunan, on November 8, 1980, with her ancestral home in Wuhu, Anhui. She was raised in Guangzhou, Guangdong and is the younger of two children, with an elder brother.

Liu became the student in charge of entertainment in her class when she was a pupil. Liu enrolled at Hunan Normal University, earning a bachelor's degree in Chinese literature.

Hosting career
Liu joined Guangdong Television to host television in 1999, at the same year, she entered Communication University of China.

In March 2000, Liu hosted Financial Report and Green News in Southern Television Guangdong. From 2001 to 2002, she hosted Walking in Guangzhou.

In November 2002, Liu joined Hunan Public Channel and hosted Public News.

In 2004, Liu returned to Guangzhou, she hosted Guangdong, Hong Kong and Macao in Guangdong Television.

In December 2005, Liu joined Enlight Media.

Acting career

Liu made her acting debut in 2008 when she was chosen to act as a supporting actor in fantasy film Painted Skin.

In 2009, Liu acted in the historical television series The Legend of Yang Guifei directed by You Xiaogang, playing the role of Empress Zhang.

Liu had a minor role as Yun Mei in fantasy film Mural (2011), and also starred in Wong Jing's romance film Marry Mr. Prefect.

In 2012, Liu was cast in the historical television series Against the Blade of Honour, which adapted from Taiwanese novelist Gu Long's wuxia novel of the same title. However the series has not been broadcast to date.

After playing minor roles in various films and television series, Liu then acted bigger roles in Badges of Fury, The Incredible Truth, Jian Bing Man and I Belonged to You, which enjoyed commercial box office success in China and she quickly rose to prominence.

In 2016, Liu reunited with fellow I Belonged to You co-star Yang Yang in xianxia drama Martial Universe. She was nominated for the Best Supporting Actress award with her performance in military drama Young Marshal.

Filmography

Film

Television series

Discography

Albums

Singles

Awards

References

External links

1980 births
People from Hengyang
People from Wuhu
Communication University of China alumni
Hunan Normal University alumni
Chinese Mandopop singers
Actresses from Hunan
Living people
Chinese film actresses
Chinese television actresses
21st-century Chinese actresses
21st-century Chinese women singers